Saint-Loup-des-Chaumes is a commune in the Cher department in the Centre-Val de Loire region of France.

Geography
The A71 autoroute passes through the eastern side of the commune.

Population

Sights
 The church of St. Loup, dating from the twelfth century.
 The ruins of a fourteenth-century chateau.
 An eighteenth-century watermill.
 Traces of a Roman aqueduct.

See also
Communes of the Cher department

References

External links

Annuaire Mairie website 

Communes of Cher (department)